Friedrich Engelhorn (17 July 1821 – 11 March 1902) was a German industrialist and founder of BASF in Ludwigshafen.

Curriculum Vitae 
Friedrich Engelhorn was born on 17 July 1821 in Mannheim, where his father was a brewery master and pub owner. At the age of nine he was sent to the local grammar school, but left the school four years later and took up an apprenticeship to become a goldsmith. After the traditional journey, which led him to Mainz, Frankfurt, Munich, Vienna, Geneva, Lyon and Paris, in 1847 Engelhorn opened a goldsmith’s shop in his hometown. 

As an after effect of the 1848 revolution his business began to suffer from economic problems, which is why Engelhorn established a private gasworks in Mannheim. He produced and sold bottled gas, which was used for lighting pubs and workshops. Three years later Engelhorn became tenant of the public gasworks and began lighting the city`s streets with gas.

As director of BASF 

When producing gas from coal big amounts of tar were left as by-product. In 1856 William Perkin discovered that tar could be used to make synthetic dyes from aniline. Engelhorn recognised quickly the opportunities Perkin`s discovery could have for his own business and founded a small aniline and dyestuff factory, which was located not far away from the Mannheim gasworks. In 1861 he started producing fuchsin. 

Four years later Engelhorn wanted to enlarge his engagement in the chemical industry and with several partners he founded the “Badische Anilin- & Soda-Fabrik” (BASF) on 6 April 1865. But the businessmen had problems finding a location for their new company. At first they wanted to buy ground in Mannheim, but their bid failed because of the town council, which was not willing to sell land for the new factory. The day after its decision Engelhorn, who had become commercial director of the corporation, went to neighbouring Ludwigshafen and bought ground there.

The new venture was a great success and became soon an important chemical company. Two years after its foundation BASF employed already more than 300 workers. It needed a few years only, until first steps towards a multinational company were made. In 1873 a sales office was set up in New York. Three years later a production site in Butirki near Moscow was opened and in 1878 a French factory in Neuville-sur-Saône was taken over.   

From the beginning BASF was engaged in the chemical research. On behalf of Friedrich Engelhorn in 1868 the company appointed the chemist Heinrich Caro as first head of its laboratory. In collaboration with professor Carl Graebe and Carl Liebermann from Berlin University the first synthetic dyestuff alizarin was discovered. Finally in 1869 the path-breaking discovery was patented in Prussia, France and England.

Later years 

After quarrels with his partners, Engelhorn moved from the managing to the supervisory board of BASF in 1884 and left the company a year later. In 1883 he had already bought the medical firm ’’Boehringer und Söhne’’ in Mannheim. In the same year, his oldest son became head of this factory. 

Engelhorn was a member of the supervisory boards of other companies like the ’’Deutsche Zelluloidfabrik’’ (German Celluloidfactory) in Eilenburg in Saxonia, too.

On 11 March 1902 Friedrich Engelhorn died in Mannheim. He was a Christian.

In 1957 the new commercial department of BASF, which is a high-rise of 101 meters and a landmark of the Ludwigshafen site, was named after him.

Literature 

 Hippel, Wolfgang von: Becoming a Global Corporation – BASF from 1865 to 1900, in: Abelshauser, Werner (ed.), German Industry and Global Enterprise – BASF: The History of a Company, Cambridge 2004, p. 5-35.

References

External links 
 History of BASF

BASF people
Businesspeople from Mannheim
People from the Grand Duchy of Baden
1821 births
1902 deaths
German company founders
German industrialists
German chemical industry people
19th-century German businesspeople
German Christians
Engelhorn family